Strangers When We Meet may refer to:

Strangers When We Meet, a 1958 novel by Evan Hunter
Strangers When We Meet (film), a 1960 film adaptation
"Strangers When We Meet" (David Bowie song)
"Strangers When We Meet" (The Smithereens song)